The 2018–19 McNeese State Cowboys basketball team represented McNeese State University during the 2018–19 NCAA Division I men's basketball season. The Cowboys were led by 1st-year head coach Heath Schroyer and played their home games at the new on-campus Health and Human Performance Education Complex in Lake Charles, Louisiana as members of the Southland Conference.

Previous season 
The Cowboys finished the 2017–18 season 11–17, 8–10 in Southland play to finish in a three-way tie for eighth place. They failed to qualify for the Southland tournament.

Roster

Schedule and results
Sources:

|-
!colspan=9 style=|Non-conference regular season

|-
!colspan=9 style=|Southland regular season

|-

See also
2018–19 McNeese State Cowgirls basketball team

References

McNeese Cowboys basketball seasons
McNeese State
McNeese State
McNeese State